Tibbitt to Contwoyto Winter Road is an annual ice road first built in 1982 to service mines and exploration activities in the Northwest Territories and Nunavut in Northern Canada. Most of the road (85%–87%) is built over frozen lakes, with the remaining  built on over 64 land portages between lakes.

Construction and operation

The winter road is constructed by Nuna Logistics and RTL-Robinson every January and takes about six weeks to complete. The first vehicle along each season is a Swedish-made Hägglund army-type reconnaissance vehicle designed to float if it falls through the ice; it tows an ice-thickness-detecting sonar. This is followed by road building equipment including "specialized low ground pressure equipment". The road, built extra wide to avoid blockages during blizzards and to allow opposing trucks to pass, is kept clear of snow, which acts as insulation, throughout the season as removal allows the ice to freeze faster and thicker. Once initially built, the road is checked by drilling holes into the ice. If the ice needs to be thickened, water trucks are called in to add water to that specific area. The road is only operational during February and March, an average of 67 days per year.

On some lakes, traffic may be re-routed to new lanes to avoid damaged or rough sections of ice, and additional "express lanes" allow returning, empty trucks to travel at higher speeds.

Speed limits are strictly enforced by security personnel with radar used to clock speeds just as national and provincial police forces do.

There are three road camps servicing drivers hauling loads along the road, they are at: Dome Lake Maintenance Camp, Lockhart Lake and Lac de Gras. Dome Lake is for maintenance crew and emergency use for drivers, Lockhart Lake provides drivers with food, shower, and a place to do laundry. Lac de Gras is for road crews, emergency use and for driver facilities for drivers travelling north of Ekati.

Truck drivers are not allowed to travel the winter road alone, therefore, up to four trucks are dispatched from Yellowknife every 20 minutes. Heavy and wide loads are dispatched from Yellowknife between 12:00 am and 6:00 am to avoid daily commuter traffic.

The main product shipped is diesel fuel and other materiel includes "cement, tires, prill (ammonium nitrate) for explosives manufacture, and construction materials."

History
The Tibbitt to Contwoyto Ice Road follows part of the original road that was cleared to the Tundra Mine in 1960–1961 by John Denison. This road began at Discovery Mine which was already connected to Yellowknife by ice road up the Yellowknife River and swung east to Gordon Lake, heading north up Drybones, Lockhart and Mackay Lakes where the Tundra Mine was located. This route was used until 1968 when the mine closed.

The road was reopened in 1979 as part of an equipment haul to the new Lupin Mine at Contwoyto Lake, now Nunavut but then the NWT, pioneered by Robinson's Trucking and Hugh Arden. It followed the old Discovery Mine to Gordon Lake route. An experimental operation, Lupin decided not to continue using the road at this time and relied instead on Hercules C-130 aircraft to haul in machinery during construction of the mine.

In 1983, the ice road to Lupin Mine reopened as an economic alternative to yearly freight haul using aircraft. The section between Tibbitt Lake (at the end of the Ingraham Trail) and Gordon Lake was built at this time. Another gold mine, the Salmita Mine (operated between 1983 and 1987) also benefited from this ice road.

Until 1998, the road was licensed and operated by Echo Bay Mines, owners of the Lupin Mine, after which it became a joint venture between Echo Bay Mines, BHP Billiton, and Diavik Diamond Mines.

Since 1999, the road has been licensed and operated by the Tibbitt to Contwoyto Winter Road Joint Venture, today a partnership between BHP Billiton, Diavik Diamond Mines (Rio Tinto) and De Beers Canada. The road is engineered by Nor-Ex Ice Engineering, and, since 1998, Nuna Logistics, a 51% Inuit owned joint venture between the Nunasi Corporation, Kitikmeot Corporation and Nuna Management Group, has been responsible for the annual construction, maintenance, dispatching, and camp catering for the primary road, with RTL Enterprises taking care of the secondary road. Security on the road, provided by SecureCheck until 2009, is now provided by Det’on Cho Scarlet Security. Det’on Cho is a Yellowknives Dene company with headquarters in N'Dilo and Scarlet Security, based in Yellowknife, is an Alarand affiliate.

The year 2007 saw record usage of the ice road with 10,922 loads north, totalling . That record number doesn't include the 818 back hauls south, totalling . The road was open for 73 days from January 27 to April 9, only closed for a total of 91.5 hours (70 hours due to storms and 21.5 hours due to minor incidents). There were over 700 drivers registered during 2007 with nine accidents and one minor injury (a bruised shoulder). During the record 2007 season, there were 99 verbal, 5 written warnings and 5 speeding violations. Nine five-day suspensions and seven season suspensions were issued.

In 2007 the road was featured on The History Channel series called Ice Road Truckers. The mining company that owned the road where the first season was filmed felt that the show portrayed the road in a negative fashion, and decided not to participate in future seasons of the show. A new rule for the Tibbitt to Contwoyto Winter Roads was enacted for the 2008 season prohibiting commercial, media, video or rolling film cameras either inside or attached to the outside of vehicle. The show's producers said that they had located an alternate ice road and that there would be a second season of the show; the road featured in season 2 was the Tuktoyaktuk Winter Road.

Routes

Primary route

From there, it winds its way north the following destinations:

The road ends in Jericho Diamond Mine, at the north end of Contwoyto Lake, Nunavut.
With the closing of the Lupin and Jericho mines, the road is no longer built to Contwoyto Lake. According to the 2020 JVTC Map book the road is shorted to 367km at the Ekati Mine on Lac De Gras.

Secondary route
The road heads north across the lake just to the west of Cassidy Point and through Quyta Lake where some of the earliest gold samples were found in 1933. From there the road continues north to Johnston Lake and then northeast to Giauque Lake, with a road heading west to the old Discovery Mine, now the Yellowknife Gold Project operated by Tyhee Development. From Giauque the road travels east across Thistlethwaite Lake and northeast through Smokey Lake before joining the main route just north of Gordon Lake.

Maps

Tibbitt Lake - 
Dome Lake - 
Lockhart Lake - 
Snap Lake Diamond Mine - 
Gahcho Kue Diamond Mine Project - 
Lac de Gras - 
Diavik Diamond Mine - 
Misery - 
Ekati Diamond Mine - 
Pellatt Lake - 
Lupin Mine - 

Jericho Diamond Mine - 
Prosperous Lake - 
Cassidy Point - 
Quyta Lake - 
Johnston Lake - 
Giauque Lake - 
Yellowknife Gold Project - 
Thistlethwaite Lake - 
Smokey Lake - 
Gordon Lake -

Media
The ice road was the location of the first season of Ice Road Truckers.

This road inspired the Netflix movie The Ice Road.

See also
Highways in Nunavut
Wetum Road

References

External links
NWT Road Reports at the Government of Northwest Territories]

Ice roads
Roads in the Northwest Territories
Roads in Nunavut